Maja Vidmar (born 28 June 1961) is a Slovene poet, author of several poetry collections.

For her collection of poems Prisotnost (Presence) she won the Jenko Award in 2005  and the Prešeren Foundation Award in 2006.

Poetry collections

 Razdalje telesa (Body Distances), 1984
 Način vezave (Ways of Binding), 1988
 Ihta smeri (Urgent Direction: Selected Poems), 1989
 Ob vznožju (At the Base), 1998
 Prisotnost (Presence), 2005
 Sobe (Rooms), 2008

References

Slovenian poets
Slovenian women poets
Living people
1961 births
People from Nova Gorica